Oituz (formerly Grozești) is a commune in Bacău County, Western Moldavia, Romania. It is composed of six villages: Călcâi (Zöldlonka), Ferestrău-Oituz (Fűrészfalva), Hârja (Herzsa), Marginea, Oituz and Poiana Sărată (Sósmező).

Oituz was the site of three battles during the First World War: the First, Second, and the Third Battle of Oituz.

According to Iorgu Iordan, the commune's name is of Turkic origin; otuz or oltuz means "thirty" in some Turkic languages.

Poiana Sărată village is part of Transylvania; in Austria-Hungary, it belonged to Háromszék County, and after a reorganization to Trei Scaune County in Romania until 1950.

Demographics
At the 2002 census, 99.8% of inhabitants were ethnic Romanians and 0.2% Hungarians. 49.2% were Romanian Orthodox, 48.9% Roman Catholic and 1.8% Seventh-day Adventist.

Natives
Eugen Cristescu (1895–1950)
Aurora Gruescu (1914–2005)
 (1883–1967)

References

Communes in Bacău County
Localities in Western Moldavia